Swansea Jack (1930 – October 1937) was a famous Welsh dog who rescued 27 people from the docks and riverbanks of Swansea, Wales.

Life 

Swansea Jack was a black retriever with a longish coat. He was similar in appearance to a modern Flat-Coated Retriever, but was instead identified at the time as a Newfoundland dog, despite being considerably smaller and lighter in build than the typical modern Newfoundland dog, possibly because he was reported to have been born in Newfoundland. He lived in the North Dock / River Tawe area of Swansea with his master, William Thomas. Jack would always respond to cries for help from the water, diving into the water and pulling whoever was in difficulty to safety at the dockside.

His first rescue, in June 1931, when he saved a 12-year-old boy, went unreported. A few weeks later, this time in front of a crowd, Jack rescued a swimmer from the docks. His photograph appeared in the local paper and the local council awarded him a silver collar. In 1936 he had the prestigious 'Bravest Dog of the Year' award bestowed upon him by the Star newspaper in London.

He received a silver cup from the Lord Mayor of London and he is still the only dog to have been awarded two bronze medals by the National Canine Defence League (now known as Dogs Trust). Legend has it that in his lifetime he saved 27 people from the Docks / River Tawe. Swansea Jack died in October 1937 after eating rat poison. His death was reported by the press across the UK and the press claimed he had saved 29 lives (for example, Nottingham Journal 5 October 1937).

His burial monument, paid for by public subscription, is located on the Promenade in Swansea near St Helen's Rugby Ground. In 2000, Swansea Jack was named 'Dog of the Century' by NewFound Friends of Bristol who train domestic dogs in aquatic rescue techniques.

See also
 List of individual dogs

References

Further reading

See also
 PDSA Dickin Medal (instituted in 1943) and PDSA Gold Medal (instituted in 2001)

1930 animal births
1937 animal deaths
1930s in Wales
Dog monuments
History of Swansea
Individual animals in Wales
Individual dogs
Lifesaving